The 2018 ASEAN University Games, officially known as the 19th ASEAN University Games, was a Southeast Asian university multi-sports event which was held in Myanmar from 8 December 2018 to 19 December 2018. This was the first time Myanmar  hosted the ASEAN University Games.

Preparation and development 
The Ministry of Education and the Ministry of Health and Sports organized the 19th AUG Organization Committee, led by patron vice president Myint Swe, chairman Myo Thein Gyi, vice chairman Myint Htwe and other ten working committees. They selected the athletes from all of the universities and trained them.

Venues

The 19th ASEAN University Games has 13 venues for the games. The athlete's village is in Zabuthiri Township with two Cluster, Myitkyina Cluster and Monywa Cluster.

Marketing

Motto
The official motto for the games is Youth and Friendship. It was chosen to represent that the athletes will compete with sports spirit and friendship for their country image. Youth is representative of being alert, agile and energetic. Youth is also referred to as young students from ASEAN universities who will be building up a better future for the ASEAN community. The 19th AUG will provide better opportunities for all participants to strengthen the understanding and cooperation among ASEAN countries in the long run. Friendships will be formed while the youth are participating in the 19th AUG 2018. This close friendship will provide a platform for all participants to appreciate the different cultures and values. The 19th AUG will also bring unity, peace and harmony to the whole ASEAN community. Peace and harmony will result in the safety of the whole region. This will help to build up our strength, making ASEAN member countries better and stronger.

Logo
The emblem or logo of the 19th ASEAN University Games is designed to include a coloured pattern used in the National Flag of Myanmar. The yellow represents belief, serenity and wisdom. The golden beams shining from the yellow sun are symbolic of 11 ASEAN countries. The green is used to depict peace, harmony and unity. This colour also symbolizes a range of mountains covered with plants and trees. The red is representative of courage, bravery and loyalty. It also symbolizes the current situation of Myanmar moving steadily towards being a federal democratic country. The white star, depicted as an athlete doing warm-up exercises, is used as a symbol of a sport competition. The Parliament Complex, symbolic of the Capital of Myanmar, implies that the 19th ASEAN University Games will be held in Nay Pyi Taw.

Mascot
The official mascot for the games is Ayeyarwady Dolphin. it was chosen for its presence in the three rivers of Southeast Asia Nations: Ayeyarwady River (MYANMAR), the Mahakam River (INDONESIAN BORNEO) and Mekong River. They are the most intelligent animal among all animals all over the world. And they are adorable, active, intelligent, friendly and helpful. So using the Ayeyarwady Dolphin can reflect that young people are active, intelligent, youthful, helpful and kind. For Myanmar, Ayeyarwady Dolphin is one of the luckiest one of Myanmar because they always help Fishermen in catching fishes and can attract the interest of foreigners by Ecotourism.Nowadays there are a few left and almost endanger. So Myanmar want all of you to know that all of us must protect Ayeyarwady Dolphin from disappearing.

The Games

Opening ceremony
The opening ceremony was held in the Wunnatheikdi Indoor Stadium on 10 December. Some Myanmar artists sang songs before the ceremony. The Vice-President of Myanmar Myint Swe arrived at 5PM.When he was arrived the ceremony was started with countdown. Then, the officials and athletes from the 11 participating countries marched into the stadium.
The Myanmar national flag, AUSC flag and 19th AUG-Myanmar flag were hoisted. The patron of the 19th AUG Organising Committee, Vice President U Myint Swe declared the opening of the games.

The students from the National University of Arts and Culture - Yangon and Mandalay presented the four Myanmar Cultural performances and one ASEAN performance. The ceremony was concluded at about 7PM.

Sports
There were 17 sports for these games.

Calendar

Medal table

References

External links
 2018 ASEAN University Games official website 

ASEAN University Games
Multi-sport events in Myanmar
2018 in multi-sport events
International sports competitions hosted by Myanmar
2018 in Asian sport